Intelsat 804 was a communications satellite operated by Intelsat. Launched in 1997 it was operated in geostationary orbit at a longitude of 44 degrees east for around 8 years.

Satellite
The fourth of six Intelsat VIII satellites to be launched, Intelsat 804 was built by Lockheed Martin. It was a  spacecraft. The satellite carried a 2xLEROS-1B apogee motor for propulsion and was equipped with 38 C Band transponders and 6 Ku band transponders, powered by 2 solar cells more batteries. It was designed for a fourteen-year service life.

Launch
The launch of Intelsat 804 made use of an Ariane 4 rocket flying from Guiana Space Centre, Kourou, French Guiana. The launch took place at 00:116 UTC on December 22, 1997, with the spacecraft entering a geosynchronous transfer orbit. The satellite subsequently fired its apogee motor to achieve geostationary orbit.

Failure
On 14 January 2005 at 22:32 UTC, there was a failure of the power system.

See also

 1997 in spaceflight

References

Intelsat satellites
Spacecraft launched in 1997